Redheads is a 1992 Australian film directed by Danny Vendramini and starring Claudia Karvan.

Plot summary
Lucy unknowingly videotapes the murder of her lover, a corrupt lawyer in the Justice Commission. When fleeing from the murder, Lucy attacks a police car. Her file is given to young lawyer, Diana.

Production
The script was developed with the assistance of the Queensland Film Development Office. The film was partly financed by the Film Finance Corporation.

It was filmed in 1991.

References

External links

Australian thriller films
1992 films
1990s English-language films
1990s Australian films